Cao Tianbao (Former name Cao Ming, born 3 April 1982 in Shenyang) is a Chinese footballer who currently plays as a striker for Chinese club Changchun Shenhua.

Club career
Tianbao started his professional football career with Changchun Yatai in 2001 after he graduated from their youth team. He gradually established himself within the Changchun squad as they fought for promotion to the top tier, eventually achieving this in the 2005 league season when they came second in the league. 

Playing in the top tier, Cao found it difficult to start many games since the club brought in Elvis Scott and then Guillaume Dah Zadi as their main strikers within the club, nevertheless Cao found his role within the team as a prolific goalscorer coming off the bench and go on to win the league title in the 2007 season with the club. 

It was only with the introduction of Li Shubin as the team's new manager did Cao Tianbao actually establish himself as the club's first-choice second striker within the team and help guide the club to a runners-up position at the end of the 2009 Chinese Super League season. When the club brought in Shen Xiangfu as their next manager, Cao found himself dropped from the starting line-up once more; however, this time when used as a substitute he wasn't able to find his goal scoring touch and was allowed to leave for second-tier club Shenzhen Phoenix at the beginning of the 2011 league season. At the club, he was reunited with Li Shubin and was given the number 14 shirt once again. He was released by Changchun at the end of 2014 season.

In July 2015, Cao transferred to China League Two side Meizhou Kejia. 
In March 2016, Cao transferred to fellow China League Two side Shenzhen Renren.  

On 23 February 2017, Cao transferred to Chengdu Qbao. Despite finishing tenth out of twenty-four teams, the club withdrew from the League before the 2018 season when the its owner was under investigation for an illegal fund raising scandal. On 20 March 2018, Chengdu Better City was established on its ashes, and Cao remained in its squad as they played within the fourth tier and immediately gained successive promotions. On 26 March 2021 the contract Cao had with Chengdu would expire and he joined second tier football club Sichuan Minzu on a free transfer.

International career
Cao was called up for the first time to the Chinese national team by his former coach Gao Hongbo who gave Cao his international debut in a friendly against Iran in a 1–0 win on 1 June 2009.

Career statistics
.

Honours

Club
Changchun Yatai
Chinese Super League: 2007
Chinese Jia-B League: 2003

Meizhou Kejia 
China League Two: 2015

References

External links

Player profile at sports.163.com (Chinese)
Player stats at Sohu.com (Chinese)

1982 births
Living people
Footballers from Shenyang
Chinese footballers
China international footballers
Changchun Yatai F.C. players
Changsha Ginde players
Meizhou Hakka F.C. players
Chengdu Better City F.C. players
Chinese Super League players
China League One players
China League Two players
Association football forwards